Start All Over Again is a 1985 Soviet drama film directed by Alexander Stefanovich.

Plot 
The film tells about the bard Nikolai Kovalev, who, despite his popularity among young people, is not recognized by music officials. But everything changes from an unexpected meeting.

Cast 
 Andrey Makarevich
 Maryana Polteva
 Igor Sklyar
 Aleksandra Yakovleva-Aasmäe
 Rolan Bykov
 Svetlana Nemolyaeva
 Alla Mochernyuk
 Dmitri Yuzovsky
 Ivan Agafonov
 Vyacheslav Spesivtsev

References

External links 
 

1985 films
1980s Russian-language films
Soviet drama films
1985 drama films